Yeoman is an English surname derived from "yeoman". Guppy reported it from Yorkshire and Somerset. 

It may refer to:

Bill Yeoman (1927–2020), American college football player and coach
Owain Yeoman (born 1978), Welsh actor
Ray Yeoman (1934–2004), Scottish football player and manager
Richard S. Yeoman (1904–1988), American commercial artist
Robert Yeoman (born 1951), American cinematographer
Richard Yeoman-Clark (died 2019),  British composer and sound engineer

See also
Yeoman (disambiguation)
Yeomans (surname)
Youmans (surname)

Footnotes

Occupational surnames
English-language occupational surnames
Surnames from status names